The Renault Zo is an open top concept car from Renault which was introduced in 1998 at the Geneva Motor Show.

Engine
The Zo has a 2.0 litre 16V diesel engine with direct injection producing . It has an automatic gearbox.

Innovation
The platform and the chassis are based on the Renault Spider. Therefore, the Zo is a pure two seater roadster having a pneumatic suspension system with a hydraulic pump which can adjust the ride height even when the car is being driven. On the dashboard there are only three round instruments for the speed, the revs and the fuel level.

References

External links
 The Renault Zo at ConceptCar.co.uk

Zo